CEB–NEPA Power Interconnection is a  long 330 kV powerline between Sakété (Benin) and Ikeja (Nigeria). It connects Nigeria's power grid (NEPA) with Benin's grid (CEB).

History
The project started in December 2001 and was officially opened on 13 February 2007. The purpose of the powerline is to supply electricity from Nigeria to Benin and Togo.

Description

References

External links

 Project description (African Development Fund

High-voltage transmission lines
Electric power infrastructure in Nigeria
Electric power infrastructure in Benin
2007 establishments in Nigeria
2007 establishments in Africa